Yugul may refer to the following topics associated with Northern Territory, Australia:
 Yugul people, an ethnic group
 Yugul language, an extinct language
 Yugul (band), a contemporary blues band

See also 
 Jugul

Language and nationality disambiguation pages